General elections were held in Liechtenstein on 4 April 1939. Although a new system of proportional representation had been introduced to pacify voters at a time when the country was under threat from neighbouring Nazi Germany, it was not used and the elections became known as the "silent elections" as no actual vote was held. Instead, the governing Progressive Citizens' Party and opposition Patriotic Union formed a coalition, assigning a roughly equal number of seats each, in order to prevent the German National Movement in Liechtenstein from acquiring any seats in the Landtag.

Results

By electoral district

References

Liechtenstein
1939 in Liechtenstein
Elections in Liechtenstein
April 1939 events
Uncontested elections